St Albans Bach Choir is an amateur choir based in the English cathedral city of St Albans. Since its founding in 1924 it has performed a wide range of choral music including but by no means limited to the great Bach masterpieces. It strives for the highest possible standards of music making, employing soloists of the highest calibre and professional orchestras. Performances are normally held in St Albans Cathedral. Currently, the Musical Director is Andrew Lucas, Master of the Music at the Cathedral.

The choir has been conducted by distinguished guest conductors Sir David Willcox, John Rutter CBE, Sir Richard Armstrong and Laurence Cummings.

In October 2018 the choir was recognised as being amongst "9 of The Best UK Choirs".

The choir is Registered Charity no. 285602

History and Organisation
Formed in 1924, the choir's first concert in April of that year consisted of a performance of Bach's St John Passion under Mr Luttman. No concerts were given during the Second World War, but it has performed every year since 1947 up until interrupted by the COVID-19 pandemic. The concert scheduled for March 2020 was cancelled, with no rehearsals or concerts until the Autumn of 2021.

According to the choir's Constitution, its objectives include the "presentation of public choral concerts to the highest possible standards". In pursuance of this, membership is by audition with periodic re-auditions. In addition, members are required to take periodic individual singing lessons.

The Musical Director is normally the Master of the Music at St Albans Cathedral (Andrew Lucas since 1998) and the choir's President and Vice-President are the Bishop and Dean of St Albans respectively. However, there are no formal links with the Cathedral.

Concerts and other appearances

Regular concerts
The choir normally gives three main concerts a year in St Albans Cathedral, with professional soloistst and orchestra. In alternate years the Summer concert is normally one of the major events in the biennial St Albans International Organ Festival.

For many years, the choir has also presented charity carol concerts in December, which have proven very popular. Two local charities are chosen each year, one supported by an afternoon concert aimed especially at children, and the other at an evening concert.

Guest conductors
In July 2017, Laurence Cummings, Musical Director of the London Handel Festival conducted the choir in a performance of Handel's Messiah.

In July 2013 Sir Richard Armstrong conducted the choir in a performance of Britten War Requiem.

In November 2011 and again in April 2019 the choir performed John Rutter's Requiem, conducted on both occasions by the composer.

In 1987, Sir David Willcocks conducted the choir in the world premier of the final revised version of Howard Blake Benedictus.

In 2019, Howard Blake himself conducted his Benedictus.

Other appearances

In 2013, 2015 and again in 2019, the choir was invited by John Rutter CBE to take part in his hugely popular Royal Albert Hall Christmas Concerts.

Also at the Royal Albert Hall, the choir has twice been invited by the BBC to take part in the Songs of Praise Big Sing, broadcast nationally.

In July 2017 the choir performed the Verdi Requiem in the Cadogan Hall, London. A review described the choir as "marvellous – vibrant, committed, sensitive, dynamic and securely balanced and blended."

In 2012 the choir performed the Rachmaninov Vespers in Lille Cathedral, and in 2008, Mozart's Requiem in the Rudolfinum, Prague.

In May 1978 the choir performed the Schubert Mass in E flat in the Royal Festival Hall.

Recordings
Christmas at St Albans (with the Cathedral Choir). Lammas Records LAMM081 1992.

Elgar Dream of Gerontius (also with St Albans Chamber Choir and St Albans Choral Society) St Cecilia Festival Society concert May 1988, with Catherine Wyn Rogers, Michael Goldthorpe, Michael George, conducted by Richard Stangroom. Lance Andrews Sound Services 1988.

Repertoire
Whilst a core component of the choir's repertoire includes J. S. Bach's three major choral works (St Matthew Passion, St John Passion and Mass in B minor), one of which is traditionally performed roughly every 2 years, it also extends from Monteverdi (Vespers of 1610, last performed in 1974) to the late 20th Century.

Notable concerts from recent years have included:
Dvořák Stabat Mater (2017)
Handel Messiah (2014) conducted by Laurence Cummings (Musical Director of the London Handel Festival) 
Britten War Requiem (2013) conducted by Sir Richard Armstrong
John Rutter Requiem (2011 and 2019) conducted by the composer
Orff Carmina Burana (2019)
Fanshaw African Sanctus (2006) with the composer taking part.

Commissioned Works
In 2006 the choir gave the first performance of Tenebrae by Joseph Phibbs, which was commissioned by the choir.

Other First Performances
In 1987, the choir gave the first performance of the final revised version of Howard Blake Benedictus, conducted by Sir David Willcocks.

In 2019 the choir gave the first performance of Walking in the Air by Howard Blake in a new arrangement with choral backing. The soloist was Peter Auty, the treble soloist in the film version, now a tenor.

Music Directors
The following is a list of music directors since the choir's founding:
 Willie Lewis Luttman 1924 - 1930
 C E Osmond 1931
 Albert Tysoe 1938 - 1945
 Meredith Davies 1947 - 1949
 Peter Burton 1950 - 1957
 Peter Hurford 1958 - 1978
 Stephen Darlington 1978 - 1985
 Colin Walsh 1985 - 1988
 Barry Rose 1989 - 1997
 Andrew Lucas 1998–present

St Albans Celebration Choir
Choir funds are supplemented by a small group drawing its members exclusively from the St Albans Bach Choir, but  managed separately from the main choir. It advertises its services for events such as weddings and funerals, under the name "St Albans Celebration Choir".

References

External links
 St Albans Bach Choir official website.

Classical music in the United Kingdom
Bach Choir
British choirs
Bach choirs
English choirs
Bach music ensembles
Musical groups established in 1924
Music in Hertfordshire
Musical groups from St Albans